Hypsosinga is a genus of  orb-weaver spiders first described by Anton Ausserer in 1871. The genus name is derived from the Greek "hypso", meaning "high", referring to the higher clypeus than those of the genus Singa.

In 2015, female Hypsosinga heri spiders were identified at the RSPB Radipole Lake nature reserve in Dorset, England.  The previous recorded sightings of the species in the UK were in 1898 and 1912 at Wicken Fen, Cambridgeshire.

Species
 it contains twenty-one species:
Hypsosinga alberta Levi, 1972 – Russia (East Siberia), Canada
Hypsosinga alboria Yin, Wang, Xie & Peng, 1990 – China
Hypsosinga albovittata (Westring, 1851) – Europe, North Africa, Turkey, Caucasus, Russia (Europe to Far East), Middle East, Central Asia
Hypsosinga clax Oliger, 1993 – Russia (Far East)
Hypsosinga funebris (Keyserling, 1892) – USA, Canada
Hypsosinga groenlandica Simon, 1889 – USA, Canada, Greenland
Hypsosinga heri (Hahn, 1831) – Europe, Caucasus, Israel, Russia (Europe to Central Asia, West Siberia), Central Asia, China
Hypsosinga kazachstanica Ponomarev, 2007 – Kazakhstan
Hypsosinga lithyphantoides Caporiacco, 1947 – Uganda, Kenya
Hypsosinga l. dealbata Caporiacco, 1949 – Kenya
Hypsosinga luzhongxiani Barrion, Barrion-Dupo & Heong, 2013 – China
Hypsosinga pygmaea (Sundevall, 1831) – North America, Europe, Turkey, Israel, Caucasus, Russia (Europe to Far East), Iran, Central Asia, China, Korea, Japan
Hypsosinga p. nigra (Simon, 1909) – Vietnam
Hypsosinga p. nigriceps (Kulczyński, 1903) – Turkey
Hypsosinga rubens (Hentz, 1847) – USA, Canada
Hypsosinga sanguinea (C. L. Koch, 1844) – Europe, North Africa, Turkey, Russia (Europe to Far East), Iran, Central Asia, China, Korea, Japan
Hypsosinga satpuraensis Bodkhe, Uniyal & Kamble, 2016 – India
Hypsosinga taprobanica (Simon, 1895) – Sri Lanka
Hypsosinga turkmenica Bakhvalov, 1978 – Turkmenistan
Hypsosinga vaulogeri (Simon, 1909) – Vietnam
Hypsosinga wanica Song, Qian & Gao, 1996 – China

References

External links 

Hypsosinga at BugGuide

Araneidae
Araneomorphae genera
Cosmopolitan spiders
Taxa named by Anton Ausserer